= English Premiership =

English Premiership may refer to:

- Premiership Rugby, an English rugby union football league
- Premier League, an English association football league
